The Stannard House is a historic house at 3 George Street in Burlington, Vermont.  Built about 1850, it is a good local example of Greek Revival architecture executed in brick.  It was listed on the National Register of Historic Places in 2019.  The building is now in mixed commercial-residential use..

Description and history
The Stannard House is located on the north side of downtown Burlington, at the northwest corner of George and Pearl Streets.  It is a -story brick building, with a gabled roof.  Its main facade is four bays wide, with the bays asymmetrically placed around a centered entrance.  The entrance is set in a recess, with a columned entablature and full-length sidelight windows.  A two-story brick wing, also four bays in length, extends along George Street, recessed from the main block facade.

The house was built in 1849-50 by Doctor Ashbel Pitkin, who lived here and also operated his medical practice here.  It remained in use as a medical practice until about 1860, after which it became an owner-occupied boarding house.  The house was briefly home to American Civil War general George Stannard between 1871 and 1873, and became known as the Stannard House as a result.  Stannard made no significant alterations to the house, and was forced to sell it as a result of accounting problems related to his government service.  It was converted into apartments in the 1950s. The building is one of the few in the immediate area to survive a major urban renewal project in the 2000s.

See also
National Register of Historic Places listings in Chittenden County, Vermont

References

Houses on the National Register of Historic Places in Vermont
National Register of Historic Places in Burlington, Vermont
Greek Revival architecture in Vermont
Houses completed in 1850